Micropterix granatensis is a species of moth belonging to the family Micropterigidae. It was described by John Heath in 1981. It is known from the Iberian Peninsula.

References

External links
Image

Micropterigidae
Moths described in 1981